is a Japanese footballer who plays as defensive midfielder for J2 League club Ventforet Kofu, on loan from FC Tokyo.

Career
Manato Shinada joined FC Tokyo in 2016. On September 11, he debuted in J3 League (v Grulla Morioka).

Career statistics

References

External links

1999 births
Living people
Association football people from Saitama Prefecture
Japanese footballers
J1 League players
J2 League players
J3 League players
FC Tokyo players
FC Tokyo U-23 players
Ventforet Kofu players
Association football midfielders